A Loyal Character Dancer is a book by Qiu Xiaolong. The book features Chief Inspector Chen Cao and his friend/sidekick Detective Yu. It was published in 2002.

Plot summary

One morning in the park by the Bund, Chief Inspector Chen finds a dead body with precisely 18 axe wounds. He decides to take up the case - however, he is also ordered to escort a U.S. Marshal (Catherine Rohn) and assist her with her investigation. In this case, it means going to look for the wife of a witness in a human-smuggling investigation who will not talk unless his wife is with him. Things are complicated by the fact that the woman has gone missing.

Novels set in Shanghai
American mystery novels
Novels by Qiu Xiaolong
Novels set in China
Soho Press books
2002 American novels